This was the first edition of the tournament.

Peng Shuai won the inaugural title, defeating Patricia Maria Țig in the final, 3–6, 7–5, 6–4.

Seeds

Main draw

Finals

Top half

Bottom half

References 
 Main draw

ITF Women's Circuit - Shenzhen Longhua - Singles